The 17th annual Webby Awards for 2013 was held at the Hammerstein Ballroom in New York City on May 22, 2013, hosted by comedian Patton Oswalt. It was streamed live at www.webbyawards.com.

The Lifetime Achievement award was presented to Steve Wilhite, inventor of the GIF file format. The viral Australian public service campaign Dumb Ways to Die led the other nominees for total number of awards received, and The Onion achieved a record 19th win.

Nominees and winners

(from http://winners.webbyawards.com/2013)

References
Winners and nominees are generally named according to the organization or website winning the award, although the recipient is, technically, the web design firm or internal department that created the winning site and in the case of corporate websites, the designer's client.  Web links are provided for informational purposes, both in the most recently available archive.org version before the awards ceremony and, where available, the current website.  Many older websites no longer exist, are redirected, or have been substantially redesigned.

External links
webbyawards.com - Official Webby Awards site

2013
2013 awards in the United States
2013 in New York City
May 2013 events in the United States
2013 in Internet culture